Dieppe Mountain is a  peak in British Columbia, Canada, rising to a prominence of  above Gataga Pass. 
It is part of the Northern Rocky Mountains. 

The mountain is part of the Battle of Britain Range, in which the names of peaks commemorate the allied leaders in World War II, places where the leaders met, and battles in which Canadian troops served. 
Thus names include Mount Churchill, Mount Roosevelt, Teheran Mountain, Yalta Peak, Falaise Mountain and Ortona Mountain.

References
Citations

Sources

Two-thousanders of British Columbia
Canadian Rockies
Peace River Land District